Jim Maurice Bowler (born 1930) is an Australian geologist known for discovering the Lake Mungo remains, which are considered the oldest human remains in Australia. He is a professorial fellow at the University of Melbourne, School of Earth Sciences.

Early life
Bowler’s father was a fisherman who came from Ireland to farm in Leongatha, southern Victoria. He spent his adolescence and young adulthood working as a farmer and rancher, growing potatoes and herding cattle.  For a time, he studied to become a Jesuit priest, but gave up and went back to farming.

He left farming in his mid-twenties and enrolled at the University of Melbourne where he studied geology and received a Bachelor of Science degree in 1958, and later, a Masters in 1961. Bowler moved to Canberra in 1965 and became a research fellow at the Australian National University.

He received his PhD in 1970, for his thesis "Late quaternary environments: a study of lakes and associated sediments in south-eastern Australia."

Lake Mungo remains
Bowler made his discovery in western New South Wales in March 1969.  At the time, Bowler was in the department of biogeography and geomorphology at the Australian National University.  The human remains he found, and their subsequent radiocarbon dating, contributed to the historical rewriting of the timeline for Aboriginal settlement. They have been dated to approximately 40,000 years ago.

References

External links
University of Melbourne

1930 births
University of Melbourne people
Australian National University alumni
Geologists from Melbourne
Living people